Emerald Air can refer to one of the following airlines:

Emerald Air (USA), a defunct United States airline
Emerald Air (1995)
Emerald Airways, a defunct British airline
Emerald Airlines, an active Irish airline